The Congressional Asian Pacific American Caucus (CAPAC) is a caucus consisting of members of the United States Congress who are Asian American and Pacific Islander (AAPI), and who have a strong interest in advocating and promoting issues and concerning the AAPI community. CAPAC was founded on May 16, 1994 by former Congressman Norman Mineta.

While CAPAC describes itself as non-partisan, all of its current members are Democrats, though some past members, such as Joseph Cao, have been Republicans. This caucus generally includes members of East, Southeast, South or Pacific Islander descent, members with high concentrations of Asian Americans and Pacific Islanders in their district, or those with an interest in AAPI issues in general.

Purpose 
To ensure that legislation passed by the United States Congress, to the greatest extent possible, provides for the full participation of Asian Americans and Pacific Islanders and reflects the concerns and needs of the Asian American and Pacific Islander communities;
To educate other Members of Congress about the history, contributions and concerns of Asian Americans and Pacific Islanders;
To work with other Members and Caucuses to protect and advance the civil and constitutional rights of all Americans;
To establish policies on legislation and issues relating to persons of Asian and/or Pacific Islands ancestry who are citizens or nationals of, residents of, or immigrants to, the United States, its territories and possessions; and
To provide a structure to coordinate the efforts, and enhance the ability, of the Asian American and Pacific Islander Members of Congress to accomplish those goals.

Current membership

Leadership 
 Chair: Judy Chu  (D) (CA-28)
 First Vice-Chair: Grace Meng (D) (NY-06)
 Second Vice-Chair: Mark Takano (D) (CA-39)
 Whip: Ted Lieu (D) (CA-36)
 Freshman Representative: Jill Tokuda (D) (HI-02)

Executive board members 

 Senator Tammy Duckworth (D) (Illinois)
 Senator Mazie Hirono (D) (Hawaii)
 Senator Brian Schatz (D) (Hawaii)
 Representative Ami Bera (D) (CA-06)
 Representative Ed Case (D) (HI-01)
 Representative Dan Goldman (D) (NY-10)
 Representative Jimmy Gomez (D) (CA-34)
 Representative  Al Green (D) (TX-09)
 Representative Pramila Jayapal (D) (WA-07)
 Representative Ro Khanna (D) (CA-17)
 Representative Andy Kim (D) (NJ-03)
 Representative Raja Krishnamoorthi (D) (IL-08)
 Representative Barbara Lee (D) (CA-12) Retiring at end of 118th Congress.
 Representative Doris Matsui (D) (CA-07) 
 Delegate Gregorio Sablan (D) (MP-AL)
 Representative Bobby Scott (D) (VA-03)
 Representative Marilyn Strickland (D) (WA-10)
 Representative Shri Thanedar (D) (MI-13)

Associate members 

 Senator Catherine Cortez Masto (D) (Nevada)
 Senator Alex Padilla (D) (California)
 Senator Jacky Rosen (D) (Nevada)

 Representative Pete Aguilar (D) (CA-33)
 Representative Colin Allred (D) (TX-32)
 Representative Suzanne Bonamici (D) (OR-01)
 Representative Brendan Boyle (D) (PA-02)
 Representative Salud Carbajal (D) (CA-24)
 Representative Gerry Connolly (D) (VA-11)
 Representative Lou Correa (D) (CA-46)
 Representative Jason Crow (D) (CO-06)
 Representative Suzan DelBene (D) (WA-01)
 Representative Mark DeSaulnier (D) (CA-10)
 Representative Debbie Dingell (D) (MI-06)
 Representative Anna Eshoo (D) (CA-16)
 Representative Lizzie Fletcher (D) (TX-07)
 Representative Josh Gottheimer (D) (NJ-05)
 Representative Steven Horsford (D) (NV-04)
 Representative Sara Jacobs (D) (CA-51)
 Representative Hakeem Jeffries (D) (NY-08)
 Representative Susie Lee (D) (NV-03)
 Representative Zoe Lofgren (D) (CA-18)
 Representative Gregory Meeks (D) (NY-05)
 Representative Jerry Nadler (D) (NY-12)
 Representative Grace Napolitano (D) (CA-31)
 Representative Jimmy Panetta (D) (CA-19)
 Representative Scott Peters (D) (CA-50)
 Representative Katie Porter (D) (CA-47) Retiring at end of 118th Congress.
 Representative Jamie Raskin (D) (MD-08)
 Representative Deborah Ross (D) (NC-02)
 Representative Linda Sánchez (D) (CA-38)
 Representative Jan Schakowsky (D) (IL-09)
 Representative Adam Schiff (D) (CA-30)
 Representative Kim Schrier (D) (WA-08)
 Representative Brad Sherman (D) (CA-32)
 Representative Adam Smith (D) (WA-09)
 Representative Haley Stevens (D) (MI-11)
 Representative Eric Swalwell (D) (CA-14)
 Representative Dina Titus (D) (NV-01)
 Representative Norma Torres (D) (CA-35)
 Representative David Trone (D) (MD-06)
 Representative Nydia Velázquez (D) (NY-07)
 Representative Maxine Waters (D) (CA-43)
 Representative Bonnie Watson Coleman (D) (NJ-12)
 Representative Jennifer Wexton (D) (VA-10)

Last updated: March 8, 2023

List of chairs

Former members

Vice presidents of the United States 
 Kamala Harris (D-US), 49th Vice President of the United States (2021–present), United States Senator from California (2017–2021), 32nd Attorney General of California (2011–2017), and 27th District Attorney of San Francisco (2004–2011).

Members of Congress

 Former Representative Karen Bass (D) (CA-37) 
 Former Representative Carolyn Bourdeaux (D) (GA-07) 
 Representative Katherine Clark (D) (MA-05)
 Former Representative Marcia Fudge (D) (OH-11) 
 Former Representative Deb Haaland (D) (NM-01) 
 Former Representative Kai Kahele (D) (HI-02) 
 Former Representative Alan Lowenthal (D) (CA-47) 
 Former Representative Carolyn Maloney (D) (NY-12)
 Former Representative Jerry McNerney (D) (CA-09) 
 Former Representative Stephanie Murphy (D) (FL-07) 
 Former Representative Lucille Roybal-Allard (D) (CA-40) 
 Former Delegate Michael San Nicolas (D) (GU-AL) 
 Former Representative Jackie Speier (D) (CA-14) 
 Former Representative Thomas Suozzi (D) (NY-03)

 Served in leadership or as an executive board member

See also 
 Asian Pacific Americans in the United States Congress
 ASPIRE PAC

References

External links 

 

1994 establishments in Washington, D.C.
Asian-American issues
Asian Pacific American
Politics and race in the United States
Organizations established in 1994